Marius Todericiu (17 June 1970 – 8 August 2019) was a Romanian football player and coach who played as a goalkeeper and spent the majority of his career in Germany.

References

External links
Marius Todericiu at Sport.de

1970 births
2019 deaths
Romanian footballers
Association football goalkeepers
Liga I players
FC Brașov (1936) players
Kickers Offenbach players
1. FC Schweinfurt 05 players
FSV Salmrohr players
SV Waldhof Mannheim players
Hapoel Rishon LeZion F.C. players
2. Bundesliga players
Romanian expatriate footballers
Expatriate footballers in Germany
Romanian expatriate sportspeople in Germany
Expatriate footballers in Israel
Romanian expatriate sportspeople in Israel
Suicides in Germany
Sportspeople from Brașov